Richmond Baptist Church is in Breck Road, Liverpool, England.  It is a chapel that was built in 1864–65 and was designed by Sir James Picton.  The chapel is constructed in common brick with red brick banding and stone dressings.  It has a slate roof, is in two storeys, and has round-headed windows containing casements.  On the entrance front is a three-bay arcade with Corinthian columns.  In the gable above this is a wheel window.  Inside the church there are galleries on all four sides carried on fluted cast iron Composite columns.  The ceiling is flat and coffered.  The west gallery and the space below it is separated from the rest of the chapel by late 20th-century walls.  The chapel is recorded in the National Heritage List for England as a Grade II listed building, having been designated on 14 March 1975.  This grade is the lowest of the three gradings given to listed buildings and is applied to "buildings of national importance and special interest". On 11 February 2015, the building was purchased by Ahmadiyya Muslim Association Liverpool, part of the worldwide Ahmadiyya Muslim Association working with the motto "Love for all Hatred for None". The building is currently being used as a mosque for the members of the community living in the area. Richmond Baptist Church is now located at "The House" 27 Oakfield, a short distance from the original chapel.  From 2010 to early 2018 the fellowship met at Oakfield Methodist Church. Following an approach from the leadership of the Good News Mission the members of Richmond Baptist Church successfully refurbished the Mission buildings in Oakfield and are a thriving Christian community.

See also

Grade II listed buildings in Liverpool-L5

References

External links
Church website

Churches completed in 1865
19th-century Baptist churches
Churches in Liverpool
Ahmadiyya mosques in the United Kingdom
Grade II listed churches in Merseyside
Grade II listed buildings in Liverpool
19th-century churches in the United Kingdom
Baptist churches in Merseyside